Matanukulaelae is an uninhabited islet of Nukufetau, Tuvalu. The estimate elevation above sea level is 5 meters.

See also

 Desert island
 List of islands

References

 Map and info of Matanukulaelae. Geoview.info.

Uninhabited islands of Tuvalu
Pacific islands claimed under the Guano Islands Act
Nukufetau